Head of David was a British heavy metal band that features vocalist Stephen R. Burroughs and ex-Napalm Death member Justin Broadrick (later of Godflesh and Jesu). The band's sound paved way to various music genres, including industrial metal, grindcore and noise rock.

Band members
Stephen R. Burroughs – vocals
Eric Jurenovskis – guitars
Bipin Kumar – bass/backing vocals
Dave Cochrane – bass (1986–1989)
Paul Sharp – drums (1986–1987)
Justin Broadrick – drums (1987–1989)

Discography

References

External links
  Interview 1988 - Out of nowhere zine

English rock music groups
English stoner rock musical groups
Musical groups established in 1986
Musical groups disestablished in 1991
Musical groups reestablished in 2009
Blast First artists
1986 establishments in the United Kingdom
Avant-garde metal musical groups
English heavy metal musical groups